Juma is a city in Samarqand Region, Uzbekistan. It is the capital of Pastdargʻom District. The population of the town was 15,571 people in 1989, and 21,500 in 2016.

References

Populated places in Samarqand Region
Cities in Uzbekistan